Aval Oru Devaalayam is a 1977 Indian Malayalam film, directed by A. B. Raj and produced by R. S. Sreenivasan. The film stars Prem Nazir, Jayan, Sheela and Jayabharathi in the lead roles. The film has musical score by M. K. Arjunan.

Cast

Prem Nazir
Jayan
Sheela
Jayabharathi
Jose Prakash
Manavalan Joseph
Sreelatha Namboothiri
Cochin Haneefa
Maniyanpilla Raju
Prathapachandran
Bahadoor
G. K. Pillai
Mallika Sukumaran
PR Varalekshmi
Paravoor Bharathan
Poojappura Ravi
T. P. Madhavan
Vanchiyoor Radha
Vijay Shankar

Soundtrack
The music was composed by M. K. Arjunan and the lyrics were written by Bharanikkavu Sivakumar.

References

External links
 

1977 films
1970s Malayalam-language films
Films directed by A. B. Raj